Enid Montague is a human factors and ergonomics engineer. Montague is currently an associate professor of health informatics and the director of the Wellness and Health Enhancement Engineering Laboratory (WHEEL) in the college of computing at DePaul University. She is also an adjunct professor at Northwestern University Feinberg School of Medicine. Her work is focused on human centered automation in medicine, specifically the role of trust of both patient and employees in the healthcare ecosystem and new technologies in medicine, such as artificial intelligence and electronic health records. She leverages human factors and human-computer interaction methodologies to inform her work with the goal of creating and improving medical technology that is patient-centered.

Early life and education 

Montague was born in Yorktown, Virginia. Her interest in technology and science began in her youth as a Girl Scout and through her experiences at NASA-Langley. Montague completed a bachelor's degree in psychology at Old Dominion University where she began 'human factors' research with her college professor. Montague finished her MS and PhD degrees in industrial and systems engineering from Virginia Tech in 2008.

Research 
Montague's doctoral thesis, "Understanding Trust in Medical Technology: Using the Example of Obstetrics" identified 30 factors of trust in medical technology and distinguishes trust in technology from trust in medical technology resulting in an 80 item instrument to measure trust in medical technology which adds to the limited breadth of research on trust in medical advances. She has contributed over 100 publications (>2,000 citations) to the field of health informatics including work on human-computer interaction, health information technology, human factors and ergonomics, consumer health technology, and trust.

Journalism 
Montague writes on medical technology and is a contributing author at U.S. News & World Report. She has also contributed opinions and editorials for Scientific American, Muck Rack, and DX Latest.

Awards and honors 

 2018 US - UK Fulbright Commission at the Loughborough Design School at Loughborough University
 2014 Human Factors and Ergonomics Society (HFES) Bentzi Karsh Early-Career Service Award
 2009 Institute of Clinical and Translational Research KL2 Scholar
 2008 Virginia Tech Industrial and Systems Engineering Acclaimed Alum
 2008 Francis Research Fellow

References

External links 

Old Dominion University alumni
Year of birth missing (living people)
Living people
DePaul University faculty
Virginia Tech alumni
People from Yorktown, Virginia
21st-century American engineers
American bioinformaticians